Yin Li or Yinli may refer to:

 Yīnlì (阴历), the Chinese calendar 
 Yin Li (Cao Wei) (尹禮), Cao Wei military officer in the Three Kingdoms period
 Yin Li (Eastern Wu) (殷禮), Eastern Wu official in the Three Kingdoms period
 Yunli, birth name Yinli (胤禮), Qing dynasty prince and a son of the Kangxi Emperor
 Yin Li (politician) (尹力), Communist Party Secretary of Beijing and member of the 20th Politburo of the Chinese Communist Party
 Yin Li (director) (尹力), Chinese director
 Yin Li (殷離), character in the novel The Heaven Sword and Dragon Saber